Terence David  Stansbury (born February 27, 1961) is an American retired professional basketball player and coach.

College career
Stansbury, a graduate of Newark High School, played college basketball at Temple University.

Professional career
Stansbury played three seasons (1984–1987) in the National Basketball Association (NBA), as a member of the Indiana Pacers and Seattle SuperSonics. He finished with 2,100 points in his career, and was a three-time participant in the NBA Slam Dunk Contest, where he won three straight third-place positions in a row, from 1985 to 1987, before leaving the NBA.

Personal life
His daughter Tiffany, played in the WNBA.

References

External links
Career statistics
List of Slam Dunk Contest participants
Pro and College Stats 
Obscure Dunker: Slam contests highlighted Stansbury's brief NBA career

1961 births
Living people
21st-century African-American people
African-American basketball players
All-American college men's basketball players
American expatriate basketball people in Belgium
American expatriate basketball people in Finland
American expatriate basketball people in France
American expatriate basketball people in Greece
American expatriate basketball people in Israel
American expatriate basketball people in Luxembourg
American expatriate basketball people in the Netherlands
American men's basketball players
AEK B.C. players
Basketball coaches from California
Basketball players from Wilmington, Delaware
BSW (basketball club) players
Dallas Mavericks draft picks
Dutch Basketball League players
Feyenoord Basketball coaches
Heroes Den Bosch players
Indiana Pacers players
Levallois Sporting Club Basket players
People from Newark, Delaware
Seattle SuperSonics players
Shooting guards
SIG Basket players
Temple Owls men's basketball players
20th-century African-American sportspeople